Sarah Crouch (born 22 August 1989) is an American long-distance runner. Sarah is a contender for Team USA in the marathon. Sarah was a thirteen-time NCAA Division II All-American in cross country and Track and field as a Western Washington Vikings and a 2011 NCAA Division II National Champion in the 10,000m. Crouch started running professionally with ZAP-Reebok fresh out of college. In one of her first races as a professional runner, she finished fifth at the U.S. 10 Mile Championships. In 2011, she made her marathon debut in New York and qualified for the U.S. Olympic Marathon Trials, and in 2012, she qualified for the U.S. Olympic Trials in the 10,000m.

NCAA
In college, Sarah Porter was a 13-time All-American for Western Washington University. Sarah tied an NCAA record and made a school-record 12 national appearances during her four-year career – four each in cross country, indoor track and outdoor track.

Professional
Crouch finished 7th at the 2014 Chicago Marathon.

Crouch finished 9th at the 2016 Chicago Marathon in 2:33:48.
She finished 11th at the 2016 Boston Marathon.

Crouch previously trained in Blowing Rock, North Carolina with Zap Elite training group.

Sarah Crouch was the top American woman in Chicago at 2018 Chicago Marathon after training with her sisters, Georgia Porter (Western Colorado University alumna) & Shannon Porter (Saint Martin's University alumna) who are all sponsored by 361˚.

Sarah had a benign tumor removed from her quad in September - a few weeks before 2018 Chicago Marathon.

References

External links
 
 

1989 births
Living people
American female long-distance runners
Western Washington Vikings
Sportspeople from Washington (state)
People from Clark County, Washington
People from Blowing Rock, North Carolina
People from Morehead, Kentucky
People from Flagstaff, Arizona
21st-century American women